The Southern Africa region experiences a relatively high influx of immigration into South Africa. As of 2019, the immigration rate is continuing to increase, and the role of the female population of migrants is significantly growing in this movement and settlement. The majority of immigrants are working residents and influence the presence of several sectors in South Africa. The demographic background of this group is diverse, and the countries of origin mainly belong to Sub-Saharan Africa and push migration south. A portion have qualified as refugees since the 1990s.

At present, immigration policy is to retain the current immigration flows, although historically the government of South Africa has aimed to reduce its number of immigrants. Certain immigration laws have shifted since the end of apartheid. However, some provisions of the mid-to-late twentieth century are still in effect, and xenophobia is prevalent.

Immigration Facts and Figures
In 2019, there were 4.2 million international migrants in South Africa (this figure is unconfirmed and probably exaggerated How many immigrants live in South Africa?). This constitutes about 7.2% of the entire population, and out of this group around 2 million are women. The total net migration rate is increasing by 2.5 percent. The rate of female immigration has been expanding since post-colonialism. The most present age groups among both male and female migrants range from 25 to 34 and 35–44. There were approximately 370 thousand refugees in South Africa in 2019, the majority of which originate from neighboring Sub-Saharan African countries.

Migrants residing in South Africa pay over $1 billion (USD) in remittances, accounting for 0.2% of the nation's total economy (measured by GDP). The highest levels of remittances received from South Africa are respectively in Mozambique, Lesotho, Eswatini (also known: Swaziland), Botswana, and Malawi. Immigrants tend to be more highly skilled than non-foreign populations. However, it is common for a highly skilled worker to be limited to lowly-skilled work upon immigrating to South Africa. The most common sectors immigrants work in are casual work, restaurant, manufacturing, and construction. Around 10 percent of this group is unemployed, which is significantly lower than the average unemployment rate of South Africans.

The 2014 HSBC Expat Experience Report ranked South Africa 14th in their league table based on expat experiences.

Black Africans compose about 79.6% (2007 est.) of the population and represent different ethnic groups, including Zulu, Xhosa, Ndebele, Tsonga, Venda, Pedi, Sotho, Tswana and Swazi, as well as recent immigrants from other parts of Africa (particularly Zimbabwe, Nigeria and Democratic Republic of Congo). Whites compose 9.1% (2007 est), being the descendants of Dutch, French, British, Irish, and German settlers who began arriving at the Cape from the mid- to late 17th century, immigrants from Europe who arrived in South Africa in the twentieth century, and Portuguese who left the former Portuguese colonies of southern Africa (Angola and Mozambique) after their independence in the mid-1970s. Coloureds (8.8%, 2007 est) are mixed-race people primarily descended from the earliest settlers, their slaves, and the indigenous peoples.  The remaining 2.4% are categorized as 'Indian/Asian', including the descendants of Indian indentured sugar estate workers and traders who came to South Africa in the mid-19th (particularly around Natal), as well as a few Chinese South Africans (approximately 250,000 - 350,000).

Immigration assumptions by Statistics South Africa to South Africa based on race. Negative numbers represent net migration from South Africa to other countries.

Countries of Origin
The origins of immigrants in South Africa include many countries belonging to the African continent, and include: Angola, Botswana, Democratic Republic of the Congo, Ethiopia, Eswatini, Kenya, Malawi, Mozambique, Namibia, Nigeria, Somalia, Sudan, Tanzania, Zambia, and Zimbabwe. Most immigrants to South Africa originate from the neighboring countries of Botswana, Eswatini, Lesotho, Mozambique, and Zimbabwe. A spike in the number of immigrants in the mid-1980s can be attributed to a high demand for mine labor. In the 1990s, the Renamo War in Mozambique produced an influx of migration into South Africa, and in modern times this group is often considered with refugee status. Many work permit holders come from Kenya, Nigeria and Zimbabwe. A high number of asylum-seekers are from Somalia.

Immigration Law and Policy 
The Aliens Control Act of 1991 (ACA) is one of the last policies implemented by the apartheid regime of South Africa. It served to determine the flow of immigration into South Africa, transitioning from exclusive to selective immigration in times of high labor demands, and to induce stricter enforcement of immigration law. The policy has been critiqued internationally as a source of mass human rights violations and unconstitutionality, including minimal due process in entry, search, and arrest. The Act characterizes and considers all migrants, including refugees and asylum-seekers, as "illegal aliens."

The apartheid's general stance on immigration policy can be suggested through four major actions on programming: racist policy and legislation, exploitation of migrant labor from bordering countries, strict enforcement of legislation, and dismissal of refugee conventions of the United Nations (UN). Legislation continuously used religious or racial quotas to determine inflow and isolate certain groups from immigrating. Preferred immigrants were white Europeans or highly skilled workers. The apartheid followed a "two-gates policy" to restrict permanent residency and issue labor contracts that would ensure the eventual return migration of mining and commercial farming workers. Stricter enforcement targeted refugees from Mozambique, and "Operation Sentry" effectively deported about 47,000 of this group in 1991. Further legislation upgraded a penalty for harboring undocumented migrants to five years imprisonment, and law enforcement carried out several raids on informal settlements of migrants from Mozambique. Backed by the ACA, the apartheid government rejected language of policies introduced at international refugee conventions, essentially viewing asylum-seekers as migrants having illegally entered and settled in South Africa.

The post-apartheid regime introduced a new framework on immigration through programs such as the Reconstruction and Development Plan; Growth, Employment, Redistribution; the 1996 Presidential Commission to Investigate Labour Market Policy. While these policies dismantled the racist legislation of the previous government, the newly empowered government has been criticized for not removing the ACA and condemning the associated xenophobia which has trickled into contemporary public opinion. Since 1994, the following regimes have in fact used the ACA to implement strict immigration measures. However, in general, immigration policy was reduced in restrictiveness by 60.4% between 1994 and 2014. The post-apartheid government did approve a one-time reparation for victims of previous immigration laws deemed racist. It also implemented three amnesty policies between 1995 and 1996, benefiting mine-workers, migrants with over five years of uninterrupted residency in South Africa, and Mozambican refugees who arrived before 1992. The regime adopted an acceptance towards the UN Refugee Conventions and made South Africa a signatory in 1995. The government passed the Refugee Act of 1998, which lacked specific language to determine the status of refugee, reflecting some public disapproval which has considered refugees as falsely-posing economic migrants. As of 2015, the government's stance on immigration policy has been to maintain existing levels and rates, however, during the previous ten years it aimed to reduce the numbers of immigrants present and moving into South Africa.

Depictions of Immigrants 
The post-apartheid government miss-quoted the number of undocumented immigrants at 9 million; the actual number was closer to 500,000. They also increased deportations by 75%, deporting 600 thousand between 1994 and 2000, and 84% of this group arrived as refugees. Deportations were used as indicators of crime reduction in mass media to portray law enforcement as effective in crime-fighting. This reinforced a common assumption that lasted through later years and was upheld by the comments of public officials such as Nelson Mandela, which associates immigrants with criminality. However, immigrants in South Africa are more often victims of crime than perpetrators. Ministers and other officials have been cited blaming undocumented immigrants for lack of resources in addition to crime.

Common stereotypes placed on immigrants in South Africa can be associated with the sense of job, wage, and resource competition South Africans relate to immigration. There has been some evidence that the presence of undocumented immigrants does lesson the work opportunities of South Africa-born residents, due to this group being willing or forced to work for much lower wages. High unemployment has also been assumed to be driven from exhaustion of jobs by immigrants, although there is limited evidence to support this. "Otherness" is an indicator of xenophobia in South Africa, and some researchers believe that the racial otherness perpetrated by the apartheid was replaced by otherness of foreigners. Cultural stereotyping has increased with higher levels of immigration since the early 2000s and greater exposure to immigrants deriving from a wider scope of countries of origin. Confusion over political and civic rights has also been associated with the presence of xenophobia in South Africa.

Permits and Visas

The South Africa Immigration Act distinguishes between visas (short or long-term) and a permanent residence permit.

Long-term visas:
A foreigner must identify a visa that he/she is eligible to apply for and that is consistent with the activities he/she intends to conduct in South Africa.  
 A foreigner who wishes to work must qualify for a work category visa 
 A foreigner who intends studying in South Africa must apply for a study visa.  
 Volunteering is considered an activity and a long-term visitor visa with volunteering endorsement must be applied for and granted for this purpose.  
 A foreigner who intends to conduct a business he/she owns and to be actively involved in the business' daily activities  whilst in South Africa can only do so if in possession of a business visa.  
 Foreign spouses (by marriage or life-partnership) of a South African citizen or permanent resident can apply for a spousal based visa.   
 Spouses and children of long-term visa holders can apply for long-term visitor visas to accompany their family member in South Africa. 
 Foreigners wishing to retire in South Africa, may apply for a retired person visa either on the basis of receipt of pensions and/or irrevocable annuities or on the basis of demonstrating ownership of a combination of assets realising monthly income.  The amount of the pension or income necessary to qualify for a retired person visa is determined by the Minister of Home Affairs and published in the Government Gazzette.

Unless exceptional circumstances as Regulated apply, the holder of a visitor visa (short or long-term) cannot apply for a change of status to any other visa category from within South Africa.  Foreigners are required to apply for their first long-term visas from their country of origin or ordinary residence.  On 28 June 2019, a landmark Judgement  was handed down in the Constitutional Court related to regulatory restrictions preventing spouses and children of South African citizens and/or permanent residents from being able to apply for their long-term visas from within South Africa without having to do so form their country of origin [Nandutu and Others v Minister of Home Affairs and Others (CCT114/18)]

Permanent residence permit:
A foreigner may qualify to apply for permanent residence either in terms of section 26 of the Immigration Act (direct residence) or in terms of section 27 of the Act (indirect residence).

 Section 26 of the Act includes the following provisions for direct permanent residence:

(a) WORK : Continuous work visas and permanent employment: the applicant needs (i) to have a valid work category visa at the time of submission of his/her application (excluding ICT work visas AND (ii) have had at least 5 continuous years of work visas AND (iii) have a permanent offer/contract of employment to support the application.

(b) SPOUSES: The spouse of no less than 5 years (by marriage or life-partnership) of a South African citizen or permanent resident qualifies for permanent residence.  The continued existence of the relationship through the processing of the application and for at least 2 years after date of issuance determines the validity of the permit.

(c) CHILDREN:  The child (under the age of 21) of a South African citizen or permanent resident qualifies for permanent residence.

(d) SA MAJOR CHILDREN: The child (over the age of 21) of a South African citizen qualifies for permanent residence,

 
 Section 27 of the Act includes the following provisions for "indirect permanent residence":

(a) WORK ; this provision is not being processed by the DHA as separate to section 26(a) detailed above.

(b) EXTRAORDINARY SKILLS: A foreigner who (i) has been issued a critical skills work visa and is in possession of such visa and (ii) has accrued at least 5 years of post qualification professional experiences is eligible to apply for permanent residence.

(c) BUSINESS: A foreigner who has invested in a South African business that is operating and (i) his/her foreign direct investment qualifies as per the requirements of a business visa and (ii) the business is operating in compliance with the prescribed requirements is eligible to apply for permanent residence.

(d) REFUGEE:  A formally recognised Refugee who has obtained certification by the Standing Committee qualifies to apply for permanent residence.

(e) RETIREMENT: A foreigner who is in receipt of pensions and/or irrevocable annuities equivalent to no less than the minimum monthly rrepscibed amount qualifies for permanent residence.

(f) NEW WORTH: A foreigner who has a net worth of no less than the equivalent of R12million and who undertakes to pay a onceoff non-refundable fee of R120,000 to the DHA should his/her application be approved is eligible to apply for permanent residence.

———————

Attacks on Immigrants

In 2008, a series of riots and violent attacks against foreigners of varying origin resulted in the deaths of more than 60 people, and the displacement of over 100,000 immigrants. Many of the homeless were re-sheltered in tent settlements similar to those reserved for refugees fleeing war. Leading up to and following the violence there had been a history of locals mugging, robbing, and beating immigrants, and a deep-rooted movement of anti-immigrant sentiment that can be traced back to the apartheid.

The violence spread to other townships later that week across the Gauteng Province of South Africa with riots reported in several settlements including Diepsloot, Johannesburg central, Jeppestown, Hillbrow and others. A man was burnt to death near Reiger Park on the East Rand. Police had arrested more than 200 people on charges including murder, attempted murder, rape, public violence and robbery. Armed police used tear gas and rubber bullets to quell rioting in central Johannesburg, attacks on foreigners and looting of foreign owned shops. The violence then spread to the coastal city of Durban

Several public demonstrations emerged following the 2008 attacks in protest of xenophobia in South Africa, with slogans such as "Shame on Us," "Join the Fight Against Xenophobia," and "Don't Touch My Sista."

In 2015, there was another wave of violence against foreigners in Johannesburg and other places, which caused panic and despair in neighbouring Zimbabwe.

On 23–27 March 2019 groups armed with machetes broke into the homes of migrants in Durban. At least six people were killed, several were wounded and their homes were looted. At least 300 Malawi migrants were forced to leave the country. In separate attacks, foreign truck drivers were forced out of their vehicles and were attacked with knives. On 2 April 2019, another group of migrants in Durban was attacked and forced to flee their homes. The escalating violence added tension to the upcoming 2019 South African general election.

There have been several incidents of police brutality and high arrest rates targeting foreign-born residents.

Among the victims of trafficking which occurred in South Africa between 2002 and 2017, 70.4% were women and 13.2% were children.

New Regulations
Draft Regulations were published in the Government Gazette of South Africa on 14 February 2014 for public comment. The closing date for public comment was 28 February 2014 but this was extended to 7 March 2014 to allow further submissions.

 The Act now requires that every child must possess his or her own passport.
 Study visa will be issued for the duration of the study or course.
 No business visa may be issued or renewed to a foreigner who intends to establish or invest in a business that is listed as undesirable business undertaking.
 A person issued with a business visa must employ or prove that 60% of the total staff complement is South African citizens or permanent residents.
 Quota work permit and exceptional skills work permits have been repealed. A critical skills work visa has been introduced into the Act.
 An intra-company transfer work visa will be issued for a period of four years.
 A corporate visa will be issued to South African corporate applicants to employ a number of foreigners for a period not exceeding three years, after showing the need for employment of such foreigners.
 An exchange visa (for persons under 25 years) will not be granted to conduct work pertaining to an undesirable work as published by the Minister in the Gazette, after consultation with the Minister of Trade and Industry.
 An asylum transit visa issued at a port of entry will be valid for a period of 5 days to enable the holder to report at a nearest Refugee Reception Office.
 Cross-border and transit permits have been repealed.
 Persons who overstay for a prescribed number of times will be declared as undesirable - fines will no longer be charged for overstaying.
 Section 46, which dealt with Immigration Practitioners, has been repealed as applicants will now be required to apply in person at the Mission in the country of origin or where they permanently reside.
 Couples now have to prove that they have been in a relationship for 2 years

On 28 July 2017 the South African Government has released its anticipated White Paper on Immigration that provides a policy framework for comprehensive review and overhaul of South Africa's immigration system and the introduction of significant changes over the next two years.

See also 
 Illegal immigration in South Africa
 Immigration to African countries
Immigration to Ghana

References

New immigration rules: What rights do foreign spouses have?
New amendments to the Home Affairs Act Can someone please summarise the new ammendments to the Act. - Do you understand the ammendments to the new Home Affairs act? - Lagos to Jozi Forum